The Bantam Cowboy is a 1928 American silent Western film directed by Louis King and starring Buzz Barton, Frank Rice and Nancy Drexel.

Cast
 Buzz Barton as David 'Red' Hepner 
 Frank Rice as Sidewinder Steve 
 Thomas G. Lingham as John Briggs 
 Nancy Drexel as Nan Briggs 
 Bob Fleming as Sheriff Jason Todd 
 Bill Patton as Chuck Rogers
 Sam Nelson as Jim Thornton

References

External links
 

1928 films
1928 Western (genre) films
American black-and-white films
Film Booking Offices of America films
Films directed by Louis King
Silent American Western (genre) films
1920s English-language films
1920s American films